Chris Eißler (born 19 January 1993) is a German luge athlete  who has represented Germany in the men's single event Luge World Cup.  During the 2013–14 Luge World Cup season he was victorious in the men's single event held in Winterberg with a time of 52.938.

References

External links
 

1993 births
Living people
German male lugers
Place of birth missing (living people)